Jeeto Chappar Phaad Ke was an Indian game show series which premiered on Sony TV on 26 January 2001. The show was hosted by Bollywood film actor, Govinda. The title track of the series is sung by Shaan which was composed by popular Indian composer, Lesle Lewis.

A very popular dialogue in the movie Rehnaa Hai Terre Dil Mein made reference to this show.

The series opened with a great rating of 18.1 and 17.2 across five cities.

References

Sony Entertainment Television original programming
Indian game shows
Indian reality television series